The 2008 Dubai World Cup was a horse race held at Nad Al Sheba Racecourse on Saturday 29 March 2008. It was the 13th running of the Dubai World Cup.

The winner was Stonestreet Stables & Midnight Cry Stables' Curlin, a four-year-old chestnut colt trained in the United States by Steve Asmussen and ridden by Robby Albarado. Curlin's victory was the first in the race for his jockey, trainer and owner.

Curlin had been the American Horse of the Year in 2007 when his wins included the Preakness Stakes and the Breeders' Cup Classic. He was sent to Dubai in early 2008 and won a handicap race at Nad Al Sheba on 28 February. In the 2008 Dubai World Cup he started the 4/11 favourite and won by a record margin of seven and three quarter lengths from the South African-trained Asiatic Boy, with Well Armed a neck away in third.

Race details
 Sponsor: Emirates Airline
 Purse: £3,015,075; First prize: £1,809,045
 Surface: Dirt
 Going: Fast
 Distance: 10 furlongs
 Number of runners: 12
 Winner's time: 2:01.15

Full result

 Abbreviations: nse = nose; nk = neck; shd = head; hd = head; nk = neck

Winner's details
Further details of the winner, Curlin
 Sex: Colt
 Foaled: 25 March 2004
 Country: United States
 Sire: Smart Strike; Dam: Sheriff's Deputy (Deputy Minister)
 Owner: Stonestreet Stables & Midnight Cry Stables
 Breeder: Fares Farm

References

Dubai World Cup
Dubai World Cup
Dubai World Cup
Dubai World Cup